NEWS4 or News4 or News 4 may refer to:

Philipplines
News on 4 (1987-1995), a program of People's Television Network, of the Philippines

in the United Kingdom

Channel 4 News, British television, produced by ITN
More4 News

in the United States
News 4 Tucson, also known as KVOA, NBC affiliate of Tucson, Arizona
K04QP-D (channel 4), KVOA's translator in Casas Adobes, Arizona
WJXT, also known as News 4 Jax, Jacksonville, Florida
News 4 (Reno), also known as KRNV-DT, of Reno, Nevada
News 4 New York, or WNBC, of New York City, the flagship station of NBC
News 4 San Antonio, or NEWS4SA, of San Antonio, Texas
News4Utah, also known as ABC-4, of Salt Lake City, Utah
WRC-TV, also known as NBC4, of Washington, D.C.

See also
4chan